Andrew Horace Burke (May 15, 1850 – November 17, 1918) was an American politician who was the second Governor of North Dakota from 1891 to 1893.

Biography
Burke was born in New York City in 1850 and orphaned at the age of four. Burke was adopted by a family of farmers near Noblesville, Indiana. He enlisted as a drummer boy at the age of 12 with an Indiana regiment on July 17, 1862, in the American Civil War. After returning to Indiana, he finished his education, attending what would become DePauw University for two years. In 1880, after marrying Caroline Cleveland, he moved to Casselton, North Dakota and became a general store bookkeeper.

Career
He next became a cashier of the First National Bank of Casselton and then, for six years, the Treasurer of Cass County. 
Burke was elected to the governorship in 1890 as a Republican. During Burke's administration, it was discovered that North Dakota did not have any laws for the selection of presidential electors. Burke called for a special session of the legislature to convene on June 1, 1891, and attended to the law. The state participated in the 1892 U.S. presidential election, when Grover Cleveland was elected to a second term as President of the United States. (Based on the popular vote in North Dakota – narrowly won by Populist candidate James Weaver – one Republican elector and two electors from a fusion Democratic-Populist slate were selected. The Republican elector voted for the Republican candidate, incumbent President Benjamin Harrison, while other two electors split, one voting for Cleveland and one voting for Weaver.)

Burke's political career ended when he lost favor with farmers of the state by vetoing a bill that would have forced railroads to lease sites near the tracks for building grain elevators and warehouses under conditions that were not acceptable to the railroads.  He retired to private life and later was an Inspector with the U.S. Land Office in Washington, D. C.

Death
Burke died in Roswell, New Mexico, in 1918 at the age of 68.  His remains are interred in South Park Cemetery in Roswell.

References

External links
Biography for Andrew H. Burke from the State Historical Society of North Dakota website.

Republican Party governors of North Dakota
1850 births
1918 deaths
DePauw University alumni
19th-century American politicians
Politicians from New York City